Bill Powers (born March 10, 1957) is an American politician who has served in the 111th Tennessee General Assembly since being elected in April 2019 and represents the Tennessee Senate's 22nd district.

Early life, family, and education 
He was born in Clarksville, Tennessee and continues to live there to this day. He is the husband of Fran Powers, and they are parents of three children: Spence, Louise, and Henry. He graduated with honors from the University of Tennessee with a Bachelor of Arts, English/History.

Political career

Local politics 
He was elected two terms on the Clarksville City Council. Throughout his two terms, Powers served as Chairman of Clarksville Gas & Water; Clarksville Department of Electricity/ Lightband Board of Directors; Parks & Recreation; and Board of Zoning Appeals for the city.

State politics 
Powers began his campaign for the Tennessee Senate on January 11, 2019, due to Tennessee Senator Mark Green stepping down from his position, causing a vacancy. On March 7, Powers won the Republican primary with 39.1% of the vote. On April 23, Powers won the general election with 53.6% of the vote, defeating Democrat Juanita Charles and Independent candidates Doyle Clark and David Cutting. Powers was sworn in on April 25, on the same day he voted in favor of governor Bill Lee's education savings account legislation.

On February 14, 2020, Powers co-sponsored Senate Joint Resolution 723, which called for the Tennessee Valley Authority, United States Army Corps of Engineers, and other federal authorities to join Tennessee in "aggressively addressing the Asian carp invasion in Tennessee waterways." On May 11, Powers announced that the Tennessee Department of Health had received $118,309 to expand COVID-19 testing into Stewart County, to help combat the COVID-19 pandemic.

Positions and committees 
He is a member of multiple Senate committees and subcommittees which include:

 Senate Government Operations Committee
 Education, Health and General Welfare Subcommittee of Joint Government Operations Committee
 Senate Energy, Agriculture, and Natural Resources Committee
 Judiciary and Government Subcommittee of Joint Government Operations Committee

Elections 
A special election was held on April 23, 2019 in which Powers ran as a Republican against Democratic Juanita Charles as well as Independent party members Doyle Clark and David Cutting. The results of the special election are shown in the table below.

References 

1957 births
Living people
Republican Party Tennessee state senators
University of Tennessee alumni